Aamchok is a rural municipality (गाउँपालिका) out of seven rural municipality of Bhojpur District of Province No. 1 of Nepal. There are a total of 9 municipalities in Bhojpur in which 2 are urban and 7 are rural.

Wasingtharpu, Yoo, Dummana, Thidingkha, Pawala, Dewantar, Balankha and Pangcha VDCs were merged to form Aamchok Rural Municipality. Balankha is the Headquarter of this newly formed municipality.

References

External links
 Official website

Rural municipalities in Koshi Province
Populated places in Bhojpur District, Nepal
Rural municipalities of Nepal established in 2017
Rural municipalities in Bhojpur District